Alti Aghaj-e Bozorg (also Romanized as Āltī Āghāj-e Bozorg; also known as Āltī Āqāj) is a village in Maraveh Tappeh Rural District, in the Central District of Maraveh Tappeh County, Golestan Province, Iran. At the 2006 census, its population was 447, in 80 families.

References 

Populated places in Maraveh Tappeh County